Megachile luteociliata is a species of bee in the family Megachilidae. It was discovered by Pasteels in 1965 in Kenya, describing it as a leaf-cutter bee. The species is only found in Kenya.

References

Luteociliata
Insects described in 1965